Ebenezer J. Hill (August 4, 1845 – September 27, 1917) was an American politician who was a Republican member of the United States House of Representatives from Connecticut's 4th congressional district from 1895 to 1913 and from 1915 until his death in 1917. He had previously served as a member of the Connecticut Senate from 1886 to 1887.

Early life 
He was born on August 4, 1845, in Redding, Connecticut, to Reverend Moses Hill and Charlotte Ilsley McLellan. He attended the public schools and then the  Center Academy, and Yale College in 1865 and 1866. During the Civil War enlisted in the Union Army in 1863 and served until the close of the war.

Political career 
Hill engaged in business and banking in Norwalk. He served as a Burgess of Norwalk. He served as chairman of the board of school visitors. Hill served as delegate to the Republican National Convention in 1884. He served as member of the State senate in 1886 and 1887. He served one term on the Republican State central committee.

Hill was elected as a Republican to the Fifty-fourth and to the eight succeeding Congresses (March 4, 1895 – March 3, 1913).

He served as chairman of the Committee on Expenditures in the Department of the Treasury (Sixty-first Congress).

He was an unsuccessful candidate in 1912 for reelection to the Sixty-third Congress.

Hill was elected to the Sixty-fourth and Sixty-fifth Congresses and served from March 4, 1915, until his death in Norwalk, Connecticut, September 27, 1917. He was interred in Riverside Cemetery in Norwalk, Connecticut.

See also
List of United States Congress members who died in office (1900–49)

Footnotes

Sources

Ebenezer J. Hill, late a representative from Connecticut, Memorial addresses delivered in the House of Representatives and Senate frontispiece 1919

External links 

 Ebenezer J. Hill papers (MS 279). Manuscripts and Archives, Yale University Library. 

1845 births
1917 deaths
Burials in Riverside Cemetery (Norwalk, Connecticut)
Connecticut city council members
Republican Party Connecticut state senators
Republican Party members of the Connecticut House of Representatives
Union Army soldiers
Politicians from Norwalk, Connecticut
People of Connecticut in the American Civil War
Republican Party members of the United States House of Representatives from Connecticut
Burials in Connecticut
19th-century American politicians
People from Redding, Connecticut
Yale College alumni